Oakwood City School District (Est. 1908) serves Oakwood, Montgomery County, Ohio, United States. The district operates five schools: Oakwood High School, Oakwood Junior High, Edwin D. Smith Elementary School, Harman Elementary School, and The Julian & Marjorie Lange School.  The district was ranked 6th among Ohio's 610 school districts in 2007.

References

External links
http://www.oakwoodschools.org
http://www.greatschools.net/schools.page?district=132&state=OH

School districts in Ohio
School districts established in 1908
Education in Montgomery County, Ohio
1908 establishments in Ohio